Allen Martin (12 August 1844 – 13 July 1924) was an English sailor who founded a private school at Port Adelaide, became the founding headmaster of Port Adelaide Central School, and was later an inspector of schools for the South Australian Department for Education.

History
Martin was born in Bosham, Sussex, the son of John Martin, a master mariner engaged in the coastal trade. Martin was educated at a local church school, then entered the upper grade (reserved for sons of master mariners and naval officers) of the Royal Naval College, Greenwich, where he trained as an instructor and achieved a teacher's certificate. He taught for a while, then joined the shipping firm Soames Brothers trading to India and Australia, eventually becoming mate of the Dartmouth. In 1867, after six or seven years at sea he quit the ship in Sydney, and joined the gold rush to Gympie, Queensland, followed by Kilkaven and Rockhampton. He had little luck and as mate of various vessels worked his way around the coast to Port MacDonnell, South Australia, where he worked as a labourer, loading bags of wheat for Adelaide, then worked his way to Adelaide aboard the government ship Flinders, arriving on 12 August 1869 at Port Adelaide. There he tried to find work as a labourer, and found work at Reynolds timber yards. The story goes that he was rejected by both George Shorney (1829–1891), manager of Dunn's mill, and James T. Russell (1842–1929), manager of Hart's Mill. Three months later sons of these two men would be among his first pupils.
Port Adelaide Grammar School
Port Adelaide Grammar School was founded by the (Anglican) Rev. Frank Garrett (c. 1835 – 17 September 1885) in 1863, then in 1868 the school closed and the building on St. Vincent Street was advertised for sale. The Rev. Garrett left for England at the end of that year, suffering ill health.

Allen Martin re-opened the school in January 1869 with seven pupils, reaching fifty at the end of the first year. It soon became necessary to hire a couple of pupil teachers: Charles Charlton (c. 1862 – 15 March 1931), later superintendent of primary schools, and Richard Llewellyn (c. 1860 – 6 January 1935), later headmaster of LeFevre Peninsula school. In 1876 the school building was purchased by the Council of Education, and Martin appointed headmaster.

Confusingly, another, quite different school of the same name (previously Classical and Mathematical School, Port Adelaide) was conducted concurrently (1871–1876) by James McLaughlin in Dale street, Port Adelaide.
Port Adelaide Public School
The school was taken over by the Government in 1876, initially in the old building, and Mr. Martin continued with the school as headmaster until 1 January 1900, when he was appointed an Inspector of Schools. By then the school population had grown to 1,500 students and 22 teachers. Martin was remembered, without rancour, for his strong discipline.

Seeing a value in supplementing an academic education with technical training, he set up a carpentry and wood turning shop and a small printing press for the instruction of his pupils. He was somewhat ahead of his time, however (this was before the School of Mines), and met with opposition from both the trades unions and Minister of Education, later Judge, John Hannah Gordon, and was forced to close them.
Schools Inspector
Martin was offered, and declined, promotions as headmaster of the prestigious schools at Grote Street, Sturt Street, and North Adelaide, but finally accepted the position of Inspector, at a considerable increase in salary. He moved out of the Education Department house and purchased one more suited to his large family, on Military Road, Semaphore.

He retired on 21 December 1915, over the statutory retirement age. He was then able to assist two of his sons, who were in business on St. Vincent Street, Port Adelaide, as Harold Martin & Co., electricians and motor mechanics.

Other interests
Martin's chief interest was yacht racing. He was a member of the Royal Yacht Squadron, and later served as Rear-Commodore. His "pride and joy" was the sailer Miranda, built for him in 1890 by John Fraser (c. 1866–1896), of Birkenhead, and the boys could always tell on Monday morning how well the racing went. If successful he would joke and overlook minor transgressions; if otherwise, look out! Mr. Martin was handy with the cane.

He played (Australian Rules) football with the Woodville Football Club in the days when Adelaide was the only other club. He helped found the Alberton Oval, from 1880 the home of the Port Adelaide Football Club.

He joined the South Australian Militia as a private, but quickly worked his way up the ranks, and was appointed captain of the largest company then existing, the "L" Company of Adelaide Volunteers.

Recognition
A. T. Saunders, an amateur historian with roots in the Port, referred to "Martin's Academy" as a "great school".
The Allen Martin Garden was established in the school grounds in 1924 in his memory.

Family
Allen Martin married Harriet Mart (c. 1854 – 25 August 1936) in 1870; they had five sons and seven daughters:
Harold Allen Mart Martin (1872–1945) married Alma Amalia Fechner in 1910, lived at Largs
Ethel Harriett Martin (1873–1951) married Edmund Farrow in 1900 lived in Semaphore
Ernest William "Ernie" Martin (1875–1943) married Nellie Sophia Manson Mead in 1910, lived at Semaphore
Edith Fanny Martin (1878–) married R. Tindale (of Perth)
Emma Martin (1880–1941) married Aaron Eustace Francis in 1911, lived in Mount Lofty
Grace Martin (1882–1958) married Cecil St Aubrey Middleton in 1915, lived in Dulwich
Hilda Martin (1884–) married Harrison Manuel Weir in 1908, lived in Norwood
Allen Martin (1887–) married Lilian Winifred Vortmann in 1910, lived in North Adelaide
Ivy Mart Martin (1889–1962) married Edward Charles Grigson in 1914, lived in Toorak
Thelma Dorothy Martin (1889–1968) never married, lived in Semaphore
Roth Harry (1891–1970) married Eileen Thelma Thomas in 1922, lived in Tusmore 
Lawrence/Laurence Edward Martin (1897–) married Vera Doreen Clarissa Thomas in 1921, lived in Largs
They had a home on Military Road, Semaphore, where he died.

Some of his students
W. R. Bayly headmaster of Prince Alfred College
J. R. Robertson head of Prince Alfred College preparatory school and prominent Freemason
Sir Roy Lister Robinson (1883–1952) won a scholarship to St Peter's College and was SA's second Rhodes Scholar
Professor Herbert William Gartrell (1882–1945) won a scholarship to St Peter's College and later an Angas Scholarship
William John "Willie" Walker (1869–1901), secured the last South Australian Scholarship in 1886

David Bews MHA (1850–1891), Minister of Education
Doctor Chris. Bollen, Percy Bollen, John Gething, H. Russell, Hains, F. Butler were well-known medical men
Malcolm Reid, businessman of the furniture emporium in Hindley Street

Edward Allan Farquhar (1871–1935), chairman of the Harbors Board

References 

1844 births
1924 deaths
Australian headmasters
Australian sailors
History of Port Adelaide
People from Bosham